Gnorimoschema pedmontella is a moth in the family Gelechiidae. It was described by Vactor Tousey Chambers in 1877. It is found in North America, where it has been recorded from Colorado and Ontario.

The forewings are red brown or maroon, sparsely dusted with dark brown on the disc, but densely so along the margins, especially in the apical part of the wing, where brown is the prevailing hue and is dusted with white. The hindwings are pale leaden grey.

References

Gnorimoschema
Moths described in 1877